Neil Miller may refer to:
 Neil Miller (writer) (born 1945), American researcher of LGBT history
 Neil R. Miller, American neuro-ophthalmologist
 Neil Miller (EastEnders), minor character in the show EastEnders

See also
Neal E. Miller (1909–2002), American psychologist